The Intra-Americas Sea (IAS) is the ocean region formed by the combination of the Gulf of Mexico and the Caribbean Sea, delimited due east by the Windward Islands against the western North Atlantic.

See also
American Mediterranean Sea

References

Seas of the Atlantic Ocean